Saint Barsimaeus (or Barsimeus, Barses, Barsamya; said to have died in 114 AD) (Syriac: ܒܪܣܡܝܐ possibly “son of the blind man,” an epithet of Nergal, or “son of the divine standard”) was a bishop of Edessa who is revered as a martyr.
His feast day is 30 January.
In fact, his story probably derives from that of a much later bishop of Edessa who was persecuted around 250 AD but not martyred.

Life

The standard account says Barsimaeus was a missionary bishop of Edessa, Syria. 
He was martyred in 114 AD during the persecutions of Christians by the Emperor Trajan (r.  98–117).
His feast day is 30 January in the Roman calendar, and 29 January in the Eastern calendar.
Under 30 January the Roman Martyrology commemorates Barsimeo (Barsamya), bishop of Edessa, martyred under the emperor Trajan in 106 or 112 for having been too zealous in converting his fellow Christians, particularly Sarbil, a pagan priest, and his sister Bebaia.

It seems that this story was backdated about a century and a half in order to link the early Church of Edessa to the Apostles, and in fact refers to the persecution of Barsimaeus during the persecution of Decius (r. 249–251).
He probably lived and worked in the middle of the 200s and succeeded Palut as bishop of Edessa.

In the alternative version, Barsimeo, bishop of Edessa, was beaten with rods for his faith in Christ under the emperor Decius.
After he was released from prison, he devoted the rest of his life to the governance of the church that had been entrusted to him.
A variant says that Barsimaeus had baptized Sharbel, and was arrested and tried after Sharbel was martyred. 
The arrest triggered popular protests, and the judge delayed torturing or executing him despite his refusal to obey the emperor's decree.
Then a new decree reached Edessa that repealed the previous one and ordered his release.
The crowd received him with enthusiasm as a "persecuted confessor" and friend of Sharbel.

Monks of Ramsgate account

The monks of St Augustine's Abbey, Ramsgate, wrote in their Book of Saints (1921),

Butler's account

The hagiographer Alban Butler wrote in his Lives of the Primitive Fathers, Martyrs, and Other Principal Saints, under January 30,

See also
 Martyrdom of Barsamya

Notes

Sources

 

 

Syriac Orthodox Church saints
2nd-century Christian martyrs
114 deaths